Phonetical singing is singing by learning and performing the lyrics of a song by the words' phonetic sounds, without necessarily understanding the content of the lyrics, for example, an artist who performs in Spanish even though they may not be proficient in the language.

For the DreamWorks animated film The Prince of Egypt, Israeli singer Ofra Haza sang most of the 17 versions of the song "Deliver Us" phonetically.

See also 
 Soramimi, where lyrics in one language are substituted by actual/nonsensical words in a different language.
 Mondegreen, when lyrics are misheard and substituted with musically equivalent phrases.

Phonetics
Singing
Voice types